Cooked with Cannabis is a 2020 streaming television series. The premise revolves around a cooking competition where recreational marijuana is used as an ingredient.

Cast 
 Kelis
 Leather Storrs

Notable contestants and diners 

 Coreen Carroll, winner of episode 3, "I Do Cannabis"
El-P
Meghan Gailey
Elle King
Ricki Lake
Jo Koy
Mary Lynn Rajskub
Nate Robinson
John Salley
Amanda Seales
Alaska Thunderfuck
Too $hort
Michael Voltaggio

Release 
Cooked with Cannabis was released on April 20, 2020, on Netflix.

On March 31, 2021, Netflix removed the show from its Singapore platform to comply with takedown requests from the Infocomm Media Development Authority (IMDA).

References

External links
 
 

2020 American television series debuts
English-language Netflix original programming
American non-fiction television series